Thomas Joseph Kirby (December 21, 1904 – November 25, 1967) was an American boxer who competed in the 1924 Summer Olympics. He was born in Boston, Massachusetts. In 1924 he was eliminated in the quarterfinals of the light heavyweight class after losing to the upcoming bronze medalist Sverre Sørsdal.

References

External links

1904 births
1967 deaths
Boxers from Boston
Light-heavyweight boxers
Olympic boxers of the United States
Boxers at the 1924 Summer Olympics
American male boxers